Wow! Wow! Wubbzy! is an American children's educational Flash animated television series created by Bob Boyle. The series was produced by Bolder Media (a joint venture of Frederator Studios and the Mixed Media Group) and Starz Media in association with Film Roman, and it was animated by Bardel Entertainment using both Toon Boom and Adobe Flash software. Boyle submitted his original concept as a book to Frederator Studios, the lead creative partner in Bolder Media. After more than 6000 children's book concepts were reviewed, his submission was selected for development into an animated series for preschoolers. Bob Boyle, Susan Miller, Mark Warner, and Fred Seibert served as executive producers.

Two seasons were produced, totaling 52 episodes (each consisting of two segments). Starz Media owns and distributes the series, and select episodes were aired on the Starz Kids & Family channel. The show has received an Emmy, a KidScreen Best TV Movie award (for Wubb Idol, starring Beyoncé), and a Telly award.

Premise
The show focuses on an anthropomorphic yellow, rectangular mouse-like creature named Wubbzy, who has various antics with his friends, Widget, a rabbit-like creature who can build; Walden, a bear-like creature who is a brainiac; and since the second season, Daizy, a dog-like creature who loves flowers. They all live in the town of Wuzzleburg, a fictional location with lots of creatures of every type, and all kinds of events are happening in it, especially with Wubbzy.

Episodes

At the end of most episodes of the series, there are songs, composed and sung by Brad Mossman with lyrics by creator Bob Boyle, whose topics that involve social skills, such as friendship, are related to those episodes.

Characters

Main
 Wubbzy (voiced by Grey DeLisle in the US and Janet James in the UK) is a childish and friendly yellow mouse-like creature. He is small, cute and obsessed with his tail, on which he can bounce like a pogo stick. 
 Widget (voiced by Lara Jill Miller in the US and Julie-Ann Dean in the UK) is a pink rabbit-like creature. She is a mechanical whiz with an incredibly heavy stereotypical Southern accent. She is a builder and engineer who has built all sorts of inventions.
 Walden (voiced by Carlos Alazraqui in the US and Wayne Forester in the UK) is a purple bear-like creature who speaks with an Australian accent. He is a polymath, brainiac, and scientist. His intellectualism and love for science are a common thread in the show. 
 Daizy (voiced by Tara Strong in the US and Lynn Cleckner in the UK) is a cheerful dog-like creature who is Wubbzy's neighbor. As her name suggests, she loves flowers. She was introduced in Season 2.

Supporting
 Buggy, Huggy, and Earl (voiced by Grey DeLisle, Lara Jill Miller, Carlos Alazraqui respectively) are 3 friends who sometimes hang out with Wubbzy. Buggy is turquoise, Huggy is light blue, and Earl is orange.
 Kooky Kid (voiced by Grey DeLisle in the US and Janet James in the UK) is an orange-colored creature who appears when something bizarre happens stating that it's "kooky" while wiggling his fingers.
 Shine, Shimmer, and Sparkle (voiced by Beyoncé, Tara Strong, and Grey DeLisle respectively) are pop singers known as the Wubb Girlz. All 3 are light-blue colored. Shine is blonde, Shimmer is pink-haired, and Sparkle has green hair.

Recurring
 Ty Ty the Tool Guy (voiced by Ty Pennington) is an orange-colored resident appeared in the eponym episode, titled Ty Ty the Tool Guy.
 Policeman (voiced by Carlos Alazraqui) is a light orange-colored resident who is a police officer of Wuzzleburg.
 Chef Fritz (voiced by Carlos Alazraqui in the US and Wayne Forester in the UK) is an orange-colored chef who is a chef of Wuzzleburg.
 Madame Zabinga (voiced by Grey DeLisle) is a yellow-colored resident who is the only teacher of the local ballet school. She speaks with a French accent.
 Mayor Whoozle (voiced by Carlos Alazraqui) is the eccentricly-dressed mayor of Wuzzleburg.
 News Reporter (voiced by Carlos Alazraqui in the US and Wayne Forester in the UK) is a news reporter of Wuzzleburg. He is seen in the episode "Widget Gets the Blooey Blues" 
 Miss Bookfinder (voiced by Grey DeLisle) is a librarian of the Wuzzleburg Library. She is first seen in the episode "A Little Help From Your Friends"
 Moo Moo the Magician (voiced by Carlos Alazraqui in the US and Wayne Forester in the UK) is a magician in Wuzzleburg. He first appears in "Magic Tricks" where he helps Wubbzy learn to do magic tricks.

Reception
Drew Magary of Deadspin criticized the program as "the loudest goddamn show on television... like someone took a bag of sound effects and bludgeoned you to death with it." Magary concludes that the series is "not merely bad, it’s actively harmful. It’s everything a children’s program should never be: shrill, inane, and overly stimulating."

Broadcast
Starz currently holds most distribution rights. Nickelodeon had aired the series from August 21, 2006, to February 21, 2010, and in Canada, Treehouse TV had aired episodes before moving to Playhouse Disney (later Disney Junior). The last airing on Nickelodeon was on December 20, 2010. Reruns aired on the separate sister channel, Nick Jr. from 2009 to 2014, when Nickelodeon and Paramount Global's broadcast rights in the United States expired. All mentions of the show were completely removed from the Nick Jr. website. Since that time, Starz Media has been the only worldwide distributor.

International

Wow! Wow! Wubbzy! has aired internationally. In Latin America, the series was aired initially on Discovery Kids Latin America from October 8, 2007, to 2016.

It also aired on TG4 in Ireland, DR2 in Denmark, Baraem TV in Arab countries, Super RTL in Germany, Hop! Channel in Israel, and Discovery Kids in Latin America and Brazil. The series is shown on Canal Panda, Clan, and RTP2 in Portugal and Spain.

A British English dub was aired on Nick Jr. from 2006 to 2013. A translated version of the series has been a popular addition to the "Cúla 4" children's programming lineup on the Irish language television channel TG4 since January 2011. The show has been dubbed in 15 languages and aired in over 100 countries around the world.

Home media
In UK and Australia, Season 1, Volumes 1–2 (Episodes 1–14, and 15–26) were released as season DVD boxes; these were not released in the United States.

Starz's now-defunct subsidiary, Anchor Bay Entertainment (Lionsgate Home Entertainment) has released 21 DVD compilations, the first of which was released on September 23, 2008.

References

External links

 
 Wubbzysongs

2000s American animated television series
2010s American animated television series
2000s preschool education television series
2010s preschool education television series
2006 American television series debuts
2010 American television series endings
American children's animated comedy television series
American children's animated fantasy television series
American children's animated musical television series
American flash animated television series
American preschool education television series
Animated preschool education television series
Animated television series about bears
Animated television series about rabbits and hares
English-language television shows
Television series by Film Roman
Frederator Studios
Television series created by Bob Boyle
Nick Jr. original programming